Pogonias is a genus of ray-finned fish in the family Sciaenidae. It was formerly believed to be a monotypic genus only containing the black drum, but a second species was re-described in 2019.

Species 
There are currently two described species:

 Pogonias courbina 
Pogonias cromis

References 

Sciaenidae
Ray-finned fish genera
Taxa named by Bernard Germain de Lacépède